Clarence Öfwerman (born 22 November 1957) is a Swedish record producer, best known as the longtime producer of Roxette, having been with the band from their debut album Pearls of Passion in 1986 through to 2016's Good Karma, Roxette's last studio album. He is the older brother of former Roxette percussionist, keyboardist and vocalist Staffan Öfwerman. Öfwerman also joined Per Gessle and Roxette as a live musician on various tours, including the 2009 Night of the Proms series in Belgium, the Netherlands, and Germany, as well as a mini European tour in 2010. He also joined Roxette for their first world tour in 16 years in 2011.

References

1957 births
Living people
Roxette
Swedish male musicians
Swedish record producers